Alain Néri (born 1 May 1942) is a French politician.  He was the deputy for Puy-de-Dôme's 2nd constituency from 1997 to 2011 in the National Assembly of France.  He was then senator for Puy-de-Dôme from 2011 to 2017. He is a member of the Socialiste, radical, citoyen et divers gauche.

References

1942 births
Living people
Politicians from Clermont-Ferrand
Socialist Party (France) politicians
Deputies of the 12th National Assembly of the French Fifth Republic
Deputies of the 13th National Assembly of the French Fifth Republic
Senators of Puy-de-Dôme
Mayors of places in Auvergne-Rhône-Alpes
French people of Italian descent